Bauknecht may refer to:

Surnames 
 Gottlob Bauknecht (1892-1976), German engineer

Companies 
 Bauknecht (company)